Gymnodiptychus integrigymnatus is a species of cyprinid in the genus Gymnodiptychus. It lives in the Longchuanjiang River in Tengchong, Yunnan, China and has a maximum length of 12.9 cm (5.08 inches).

References

Cyprinidae
Cyprinid fish of Asia
Freshwater fish of China